Antonio Vigilante (born 1955) is the Deputy Special Representative for Recovery and Governance in the United Nations Mission in Liberia (UNMIL). Prior to this appointment of 6 June 2014 by United Nations Secretary-General Ban Ki-moon, Antonio Vigilante served as the Director of the United Nations Office and the UNDP Representation Office in Brussels

Career

Vigilante began working for UNDP in 1981, and has served as the Resident Coordinator and UNDP Resident Representative in Egypt and Bulgaria and the UNDP Special Representative for Post-Conflict Development in South Eastern Europe.
Over the course of his career, he has served the United Nations in Barbados, Bolivia, Ethiopia, Honduras and in New York.

References

External links

Italian officials of the United Nations
Living people
1955 births
Place of birth missing (living people)